Derek McKendry (1941–1999) was a New Zealand TV veteran television cameraman. He is known for spending 8 years covering coverage on the Vietnam War. In 1979 he was almost killed in Zambia, Africa after being accused of being a spy. In 1999 Derek was in a relationship with New Zealand journalist Janet McIntyre.

References

1941 births
1999 deaths
Vietnam War photographers
New Zealand cinematographers
New Zealand photojournalists